Buwchfawromyces is a genus of anaerobic fungi isolated from buffalo faeces

References

Neocallimastigomycota